Caroline Chesebro' (March 30, 1825 – February 16, 1873) was a 19th-century American writer of fiction, including short stories, juvenile literature, and novels. Born "Caroline Chesebrough", but known by her preferred spelling of "Caroline Chesebro'", she was the founder of The Packard Quarterly.

Chesebro first became known as a writer in 1848, when she was engaged as a contributor to Graham's American Monthly Magazine. Subsequently, she was connected as a sketch writer with many prominent monthly magazines and other periodicals. In 1851, she published a volume of short stories under the collective head of Dreamland by Daylight, a Panorama of Romance, and a year later, she wrote her debut novel, Isa, a Pilgrimage, followed by another novel, Victoria, or the World Overcome, in 1856. Chesebro' also wrote The Beautiful Gate, and Other Tales, and was an occasional contributor to some of the daily newspapers. In later years, her short stories were attractive to the readers of Harper's Magazine and The Atlantic monthlies and Appletons' Journal. Writing for two decades, her publications steadily gaining favor with the public, improvement being perceptible in the later volumes.

Early life and education
Caroline Chesebrough was born at Canandaigua, New York, March 30, 1825. Her parents were Betsey Kimball and Nicoholas Goddard Chesebrough, hatter and postmaster. There were four older siblings and three that were younger. Her ancestors, Anne Stevenson and William Chesebrough, removed from England to the Massachusetts Bay Colony (1630), and were associated with the establishment of Braintree, Massachusetts, Rehoboth, Massachusetts, and Stonington, Connecticut.

Chesebro was educated at a female seminary in her local town.

Career
Chesebro remained in Canandaigua until 1835, when she was invited to a position in the Packer Collegiate Institute, Brooklyn. She had the charge of Composition in the higher departments of the institute, but lived with her brothers and sister at Piermont, New York on the Hudson River.

For many years, Chesebro' contributed prose and verse to periodicals. Between 1848 and 1851, her stories appeared in Graham's American Monthly Magazine, Holden's Dollar Magazine, The Knickerbocker, Sartain's, Peterson's Magazine, and Godey's Lady's Book. Twenty-four of her stories appeared in Dream-Land by Daylight, A Panorama of Romance (1851, J.S. Redfield). From 1851, her stories were published in Harper's Magazine, as well as Appleton's, Beadle's, Continental, Galaxy, Lippincott's, and Putnam's, as well as, beginning in 1857, The Atlantic Monthly.

Chesebro' wrote several books, among which are: Dream of Land by Day Light; Peter Carvadine; Isa, a Pilgrimage; The Children of Light; Getting Along; Victoria; and The Foe in the Household. Puy (1896) described them as, "evincing descriptive and analytical powers of a high order".

Later years
After 1865, Chesebro' returned to teaching at Packer Collegiate Institute. She died at her home near Piermont, 16 February 1873. Her funeral took place at Canandaigus.

Critical reception
On March 11, 1852, Alice Cary, wrote to the Cincinnati Gazette regarding Chesebro's Isa:—

Chesebro responded two months later in the Richmond Weekly Palladium:—

Ripley's New-York Tribune review of Chesebro's The Foe in the Household is included in Hart's A Manual of American Literature: A Text-book for Schools and Colleges (1873):—

Awards
 1855, Original prize story, entitled Rachel Prince, awarded by The Weekly Sun

Selected works

 As to Duty
 Captain Ben
 Good-Will's Sexton
 Five-Ten
 Mr. Bronson's Fall Engagements
 Philly and kit
 The Drake Difficulty
 The Feast of the Lord
 The Rivals
 The Scape-Goat
 The warrior and the poet
 Two Lives Discovered
 Victoria : or, the world overcome.
 Dream-land by daylight : a panorama of romance, 1851
 Isa : a pilgrimage, 1852
 The children of light : a theme for the time, 1853
 The little cross-bearers, 1854
 Getting along : a book of illustrations. : "Know thyself." : In two volumes. Vol. I[-II]., 1855
 Susan, the fisherman's daughter, or, Getting along : a book of illustrations, 1855
 The beautiful gate : and other tales, 1855
 Philly and Kit or, Life and raiment, 1856
 Blessings in disguise : or, Pictures of some of Miss Haydon's girls, 1863
 Peter Carradine or, The Martindale pastoral, 1863
 Annointed, 1864., 1864
 The glen cabin, or, Away to the hills., 1865
 The fishermen of Gamp's Island ; or Ye are not your own., 1865
 Amy Carr, or, The fortune-teller, 1868
 The foe in the household, 1871
 The missionary's Christmas-box, 1878
 The sparrow's fall, or, Under the willow : and other stories, 1879
 The poacher's sons, 1879

References

Attribution

Bibliography

External links
 

1825 births
1873 deaths
19th-century American writers
19th-century American women writers
19th-century American short story writers
American women short story writers
American women children's writers
American children's writers
19th-century American novelists
American women novelists
People from Canandaigua, New York
American magazine founders
19th-century American businesspeople